Dunkirk is a 1958 British war film directed by Leslie Norman that depicts the Dunkirk evacuation of World War II, and starring John Mills, Richard Attenborough, and Bernard Lee. The film is based on the novels The Big Pick-Up by Elleston Trevor and Dunkirk co-authored by Lt Col Ewan Butler and Major J. S. Bradford.

Plot
In May 1940, English journalist Charles Foreman strives to inform his readers of the dangers posed by the build-up of German forces in western Europe. He rails against the Ministry of Information for suppressing the truth. Most of his compatriots, including his neighbour John Holden, have been lulled into complacency by the lack of significant fighting during the "Phoney War". Holden owns a garage, with a profitable side-line manufacturing belt buckles for the British Army.

The Battle of France begins and the Germans advance rapidly, trapping Allied forces along the Channel coast. Corporal "Tubby" Binns of the British Expeditionary Force (BEF) and his depleted section return from a mission to find their company has withdrawn. Their officer dies in a German air attack, leaving Binns in charge of four demoralised men (Privates Barlow, Bellman, Fraser and Russell). They abandon a main road blocked by refugees and reach a Royal Artillery battery camp, where Fraser is killed in a battle. Binns is ordered to head north with his three remaining men and two other stragglers, Privates Harper and Miles, and try to find their regiment.

Meanwhile, the situation has become so desperate that BEF commander General Gort orders all units to head for Dunkirk in the hope of evacuation. In England, Vice-Admiral Ramsay directs Operation Dynamo; the Admiralty begins commandeering all suitable civilian boats, including those owned by Foreman and Holden, to sail to Dunkirk to help evacuate troops from the beaches. The boats are marshalled at Sheerness. Foreman insists on taking his motorboat Vanity to Dunkirk himself, despite warnings of the danger. Other boat owners follow his example. After initial reluctance, Holden decides to take his boat Heron too, assisted by his teenage apprentice Frankie.

Binns' section spend the night in an abandoned farmhouse, but at dawn, a German unit arrives and Bellman is badly wounded. Russell suffers concussion from a grenade blast. The section manages to escape, but are forced to leave Bellman behind. Later, after dodging a German camp under cover of darkness, they encounter a RAF lorry, manned by Airmen Froome and Pannet, and go with them to Dunkirk, where Allied troops are being subjected to regular aerial bombing and strafing. In the harbour, Binns and his men get aboard a ship, only for it to be blown up and sunk before it can depart. Their prospects of rescue are made worse by the Admiralty's decision to withdraw its destroyers. Ramsay argues against withdrawal of the destroyers and, crucially, the Admiralty agrees to send them back.

Foreman and Holden ferry many soldiers to the larger vessels, but Foreman's boat is destroyed by a bomber. He is picked up by Holden. With harbour operations no longer possible, thousands of Allied troops are gathering on the beaches. In the next Luftwaffe attack, Barlow is wounded and taken to an aid station. Herons engine breaks down just off the beach. While Russell, a motor mechanic, attempts to effect repairs, Foreman and Frankie go ashore to survey the scene. Next day, during church parade, Foreman is mortally wounded in an air attack. Russell completes his repairs and Binns' group board the boat. Joined by six more soldiers, Holden sets sail for home. At sea, the engine breaks down again and the boat drifts towards the German-held port of Calais. Fortunately, they are spotted by one of the returning destroyers and taken safely back to England.

Cast

 John Mills as Cpl "Tubby" Binns
 Richard Attenborough as John Holden
 Bernard Lee as Charles Foreman
 Robert Urquhart as Pte Mike Russell
 Ray Jackson as Pte Barlow
 Ronald Hines as Pte Miles
 Sean Barrett as Frankie, Holden's apprentice
 Roland Curram as Pte Harper
 Meredith Edwards as Pte Dave Bellman
 Michael Bates as Airman Froome
 Rodney Diak as Airman Pannet
 Michael Shillo as Jouvet, a French reporter
 Eddie Byrne as commander (Tough's Yard)
 Maxine Audley as Diana Foreman, Charles's wife
 Lionel Jeffries as colonel (medical officer)
 Victor Maddern as merchant navy seaman in pub (Maddern was a wartime merchant navy seaman.)
 Anthony Nicholls as military spokesman
 Bud Flanagan and Chesney Allen as themselves (Flanagan and Allen)
 Kenneth Cope as Lt Lumpkin
 Denys Graham as Pte Fraser
 Barry Foster as the despatch rider who directs Tubby to the artillery battery
 Warwick Ashton as battery sergeant major
 Peter Halliday as battery major
 John Welsh as staff colonel
 Lloyd Lamble as staff colonel
 Cyril Raymond as General Viscount Gort, VC
 Nicholas Hannen as Vice-Admiral Ramsay at Dover
 Patricia Plunkett as Grace Holden, John's wife
 Michael Gwynn as commander at Sheerness
 Fred Griffiths as Old Sweat
 Dan Cressy as Joe
 Christopher Rhodes as sergeant on the beaches
 Harry Landis as Dr Levy, a military doctor working on the beach
 John Horsley as padre
 Patrick Allen as sergeant on parade ground
 Bernard Cribbins as thirsty sailor (uncredited)
 William Squire as captain of minesweeper (uncredited)
 Bud Tingwell as sergeant in cookhouse (uncredited)

Production

Beach sequences were shot at Camber Sands near Rye, East Sussex, and Dunkirk town centre was recreated using part of Rye Harbour. A canal-type bridge was temporarily constructed over the upper harbour, leading on to the quayside. It was over this bridge that the refugees and troops poured into the "town centre". Several scenes take place at this location, particularly a tracking shot following two British Army officers as they discuss the situation. In the background, the viewer can make out Rye Church and some old warehouses, still extant, albeit in much restored condition. One of the warehouses was used as the interior for the "Barn Scene". The scene where the bridge was blown during the early part of the film was on the River Medway at Teston Bridge, Teston in Kent.

Director Leslie Norman later recalled:

Dunkirk was bloody difficult to make from a logistics point of view. Yet it was made for £400,000 and came in under budget... I was the council school boy who became a major in the war, and that had a lot to do with the way I felt about Dunkirk. I didn't think that Dunkirk was a defeat; I always thought it was a very gallant effort but not a victory.

The musical score is by Malcolm Arnold, which may account for the fact that many of its segments sound very much like his Academy Award-winning theme from The Bridge on the River Kwai, made the previous year (1957).

Reception

The world premiere was at the Empire, Leicester Square, in London on 20 March 1958.

The film was the third most popular production at the British box office in 1958, after Bridge on the River Kwai and The Vikings. (Other accounts say it was the second, making $1,750,000.)

According to MGM records it earned only $310,000 in the US and Canada but $1,750,000 elsewhere, resulting in a profit of $371,000.

See also
 List of British films of 1958
 List of World War II films
 Dunkirk (2017 film)

References

External links
 
 
 
 Dunkirk at BFI Screenonline

1958 films
1950s war drama films
British war drama films
Dunkirk evacuation films
World War II films based on actual events
Ealing Studios films
Metro-Goldwyn-Mayer films
Films directed by Leslie Norman
Films produced by Michael Balcon
Films scored by Malcolm Arnold
Films based on multiple works
1958 drama films
British World War II films
Films shot at MGM-British Studios
1950s English-language films
1950s British films